Godfred Yeboah (27 July 1980 – 3 August 2021) was a Ghanaian professional footballer who played as a defender.

Career 
Yeboah played one season for BA United before joining Asante Kotoko. He spent most of his career with Asante Kotoko, staying from 2001 till 2009. He won three league titles in the 2003, 2005 and 2007–08 seasons, and the Ghanaian FA Cup in 2001.

He moved from Asante Kotoko to All Stars F.C. on loan on 4 January 2008, along with the Asante Kotoko teammate Kobina Dodzie, while a third player, Habib Mohamed, moved permanently. He was on loan from January 2007 to June 2007 at Ashanti Gold and stands here in the Ghana Premier League All Star team.

Death 
He died on 3 August 2021 at the age of 41.

References 

1980 births
2021 deaths
Ghanaian footballers
Association football defenders
Ghana international footballers
Asante Kotoko S.C. players
Legon Cities FC players
Ghana Premier League players